Joaquín Cortizo Rosendo (4 October 1932 – 4 January 2018) was a Spanish professional footballer who played as a defender.

Club career
Born in Ribadavia, Province of Ourense, Cortizo signed with local RC Celta de Vigo in 1956, aged 24. He only made his La Liga debut on 14 April of the following year, in a 2–1 home win against Valencia CF; he featured sparingly during his spell at Balaídos, notably due to an intestine disease.

In the summer of 1958, Cortizo joined Real Zaragoza. He scored his first goal in the top division on 9 December 1962, but in a 2–4 loss away to Real Madrid; during his five-year tenure he won two Copa del Generalísimo trophies as well as the 1963–64 edition of the Inter-Cities Fairs Cup, being part of the Five Magnificent teams.

On 27 December 1964, Cortizo broke Atlético Madrid player Enrique Collar's leg during a 3–1 victory at La Romareda. Referee Manuel Gómez Arribas did not appreciate any foul at that moment, but the player was eventually handed a 24-match ban by the Royal Spanish Football Federation, which was a national record.

In the 1966 off-season, Cortizo moved to Real Jaén. After retiring and settling in the city, he worked for the club as technical secretary as well as president.

Death
After a long illness, Cortizo died on 4 January 2018 at the age of 85, in Jaén.

References

External links

1932 births
2018 deaths
Spanish footballers
Footballers from Galicia (Spain)
Association football defenders
La Liga players
Segunda División players
Tercera División players
RC Celta de Vigo players
Real Zaragoza players
Real Jaén footballers
Spanish football managers
Segunda División managers
Real Jaén managers